Alexander Davison (born 3 November 1979) is an Australian racing driver. He won the 2004 Australian Carrera Cup Championship. As part of the Davison motorsport family, he is the older brother of Will Davison, grandson of Lex Davison and cousin of James Davison. He currently co-drives for Dick Johnson Racing  in the Supercars Championship with Will Davison in the No. 17  Ford Mustang GT

Junior career
Starting in karts at a young age, he progressed to Formula Ford in 1998 racing a used 1995 Van Diemen RF95. With sponsorship from Wynn's and OAMPS Insurance, Davison upgraded to a year old Van Diemen RF98 for 1999 and finished third in one of the most competitive Australian Formula Ford seasons behind champion Greg Ritter. He had tied on points with Steve Owen in second, but on a countback of race wins, lost second place to Owen, who had five wins to Davison's four. After two years of Formula Ford, Davison's eyes turned to Europe.

Sports cars

Manthey Racing
Unable to break into an open-wheel series, Davison found a role with German Sports Car team Manthey Racing. After initially racing Porsche Carrera Cup in the German national series, Davison was promoted to the Porsche Supercup, a pan-European series supporting several legs of the Formula 1 World Drivers' Championship and finished sixth, including one victory at Indianapolis. Two more years with Manthey in the German series saw no significant improvement and Davison returned home to Australia during 2003.

Return to Australia
Back in Australia, Davison made some appearances in the 2003 Australian Carrera Cup Championship. After breaking through for a round win at the end of 2003, Davison dominated the 2004 Australian Carrera Cup Championship, taking his first and only major championship title to date. Despite having competed in selected V8 Supercars events in 2004 and 2005, Davison was unable to find a full-time role in V8 Supercars, and returned to the Australian Carrera Cup in 2006, joining Paul Cruickshank Racing. He took the seat of outgoing champion Fabian Coulthard and finished second to Craig Baird in the 2006 season. Into 2007, Davison took over the seat Jim Richards vacated from his own team, as Richards concentrated on other series. Davison again finished runner-up this time to David Reynolds.

Le Mans Series
In 2008, an opportunity to return to Europe beckoned and Davison took up a drive with Team Felbermayr-Proton in the 2008 Le Mans Series season. Despite not winning a single race, Davison and co-driver Marc Lieb finished runner-up in the GT2 class in their Porsche 997 GT3-RSR behind Ferrari F430 GT2 driver Rob Bell. With the same team, Davison also contested the 2008 edition of the 24 Hours of Le Mans, driving with Horst Felbermayr, Sr. and Wolf Henzler. They finished fifth in class. Some guest drives in the American Le Mans Series also cropped up, though to no significant success.

Carrera Cup comebacks
In 2012, Davison drove the Simjen 'Silver Bullet' in a return to Australian Carrera Cup. Davison won the first round of the season at the Adelaide Street Circuit before eventually finishing third in the championship.

In 2016, Davison once again entered the Australian Carrera Cup Championship full-time, winning two of the first four rounds at Albert Park and Hidden Valley Raceway.

Touring cars

Perkins Motorsport
Davison's Carrera Cup form led to him join the Perkins Motorsport V8 Supercars team for the 2004 endurance races, sharing Tony Longhurst's regular season car with Jamie Whincup. The pair finished a creditable 9th at the 2004 running of the Bathurst 1000.  Davison later replaced Longhurst for the final two sprint events of the year when the veteran left the team. This in turn led to a full-time seat with Perkins in 2005 but with results not forthcoming Davison too found himself replaced before season's end.

Stone Brothers Racing
Having returned from his European racing exploits, Davison returned to a full-time V8 Supercar seat with Stone Brothers Racing in 2009. The year was largely disappointing, and he finished the year 17th in the standings, with the highlight being a second-place finish at Hidden Valley thanks to a favourable soft tyre strategy. 2010 saw Davison fail to improve, with a ninth-place finish in the opening race of the season at the Clipsal 500 becoming one of only three top ten finishes for the year. He did, however, achieve his maiden pole position on his return to Hidden Valley, but a potential podium finish was scuppered by an electrical failure. Davison improved to finish 11th in the 2011 season, including his second career podium at the opening race of the year at the Yas Marina Circuit in Abu Dhabi. Despite his better season, Davison was replaced by Lee Holdsworth for 2012.

Team 18
After spending 2012 in Carrera Cup, Davison was recalled to V8 Supercars in 2013 to drive for Team 18, a newly formed satellite team operating with Ford Performance Racing equipment. Davison had an above average season, finishing 13th overall, peaking with a third place at the Phillip Island event.

Endurance co-driver
Davison has competed in V8 Supercars as an endurance co-driver on several occasions. In 2006, 2007 and 2012 he raced with Dick Johnson Racing while in 2008 he raced for Paul Cruickshank Racing. On all four occasions, he achieved top ten results at the Bathurst 1000. In 2014 and 2015, Davison entered the endurance races, now combined to form the Enduro Cup, with Erebus Motorsport, who ironically had bought out his former team Stone Brothers Racing. This provided Davison with the opportunity to co-drive with his brother Will Davison and included a 4th-place finish at the 2014 Bathurst 1000. Davison also entered the final sprint round of the 2015 season, the Sydney 500, for Erebus Motorsport as a replacement for Ashley Walsh.

2020*
After James Courtney's departure from Team Sydney, Alex was drafted in by Jonathon Webb to drive the #19 Local Legends Holden ZB Commodore from the Eastern Creek Round onwards. He would partner Chris Pither (#22) As of 28 November, it is unknown if Davison will remain in his drive for 2021

Personal life
Davison is the son of Australian Formula 2 champion Richard Davison, grandson of four times Australian Grand Prix winner Lex Davison and brother to Will Davison. His uncle Jon Davison, and cousins James Davison and Charlie Davison also are linked with the sport.
He has 2 children Luke Davison and Lily Davison and has been married to Melanie Davison since 2010.

Career results

Bathurst 1000 results

Porsche Supercup results
(key) (Races in bold indicate pole position) (Races in italics indicate fastest lap)

24 Hours of Le Mans results

European Le Mans Series results

McLaren Racing drivers
Porsche Carrera Cup Germany drivers